Phyllocnistis argothea is a moth of the family Gracillariidae, known from Bihar, India. The hostplant for the species is Drypetes roxburghii.

References

Phyllocnistis
Endemic fauna of India
Moths of Asia